Treaty of Nasuh Pasha
was a treaty between the Ottoman Empire and Safavid Persia after the war of 1603–1612, signed on 20 November 1612. It was made after a decisive Safavid victory. The main terms in the treaty included granting back Persian suzerainty over all of the Caucasus.

Background
Shah Abbas the Great of Persia had to concede vast areas in Northwest Iran and Caucasus to the Ottoman Empire by the Treaty of Constantinople in 1590. After solving problems at home Shah Abbas was planning to regain the losses. He waited for a suitable moment to attack. He saw his chance in 1603 when 14 years old sultan Ahmet I  ascended to Ottoman throne. Ottoman Empire was engaged in a long and costly war against the Holy Roman Empire, so called Long war (1593–1606) and there were a series of revolts in Anatolia named Jelali revolts.

The war
Shah Abbas and his general Allahverdi Khan in a surprise attack began to regain the territories lost in 1590. Although Ottoman Empire was able to raise an army against Persia, the two  commanders (serdars) Cigalazade Yusuf Sinan Pasha (1605) and Kuyucu Murat Pasha (1611)  both died in Diyarbakır, the winter camp of the army (natural cause) and  Ottoman army suffered from the lack of able commandership. Finally, Grand vizier Nasuh Pasha (also called Damat Nasuh Pasha) who became the grand vizier in 1611, agreed to sign a treaty.

The terms
 The Ottoman Empire agreed to return all territory gained by the treaty of Constantinople of 1590.
 The border line became the line drawn in the Peace of Amasya in 1555.
 In turn Persia agreed to pay an annual tribute of 200 loads (59000 kilograms) of silk.
 The route of Persian pilgrims to Haj was changed (over Syria instead of Iraq).

Aftermath

This treaty is the first treaty in Ottoman history by which the empire agreed to lose territory. (The first treaty in European theater in which the empire agreed to lose territory would be the Treaty of Karlowitz in 1699.) On the other hand, this treaty was a big success for Abbas. By the treaty he both increased his realm and  restored Safavid prestige. However, Abbas refused to pay the tribute. So the war newed in 1615.

References

1612 in the Ottoman Empire
17th century in Iran
nasuh Pasha
Nasuh Pasha
17th century in Istanbul
1612 treaties
1612 in law
Ottoman–Persian Wars